John F. Gregory (1927–November 14, 2009) was an American optical engineer and a popularizer of amateur telescope making.  He is credited with the design of a version of the Maksutov telescope called the "Gregory-Maksutov telescope".

Career
John Gregory was born in Cleveland, Ohio in 1927.  He earned bachelor's and master's degrees in engineering from the Case Institute of Technology (now Case Western Reserve University). In the 1950s he began his career working for Perkin-Elmer Corporation in Norwalk, Connecticut.  In the 1960s he worked for Barnes Engineering Company in Stamford, Connecticut, where he designed and tested lenses used in the infrared and ultraviolet.  In 1974 he became chief engineer for the University of Texas McDonald Observatory. In 1978 he left the observatory and opened Gregory Optics, an optical and telescope equipment consulting, design, and fabricating firm.

The Gregory-Maksutov telescope
In 1957, Gregory published an article in Sky & Telescope magazine entitled "A Cassegrainian-Maksutov Telescope Design for the Amateur".
In it, Gregory showed how to construct a version of the Maksutov catadioptric telescope in which all optical surfaces are spherical, and which has as secondary a small aluminized spot on the inner surface of the corrector lens.  Not only was Gregory's design simpler than the classical Maksutov design; it also had the advantage of fixing the alignment of the secondary, making the telescope more robust, and eliminating the need for a secondary support that would otherwise cause diffraction spikes in the image. Most Maksutov telescopes manufactured today are of this type, which has come to be called either a "Gregory-Maksutov" or a "Spot-Maksutov".

Gregory's article included detailed optical specifications as well as shop techniques and testing algorithms.  Many more articles were published by Gregory and others on his design in the "Gleanings for ATMs" column in Sky & Telescope, culminating in the 39-page pamphlet Gleanings Bulletin C.

Gregory went on to design a 22-inch f/3.7 Maksutov telescope for the Stamford Museum and Nature Center in Connecticut; this telescope is still the largest Maksutov in the U.S. In 1980 he donated an 8.2-inch f/16 Maksutov-Cassegrain that he had constructed to his alma mater, Case Western Reserve; he named it the "Nassau Memorial Telescope" after his former teacher there, astronomer J. J. Nassau.

At the 2006 Riverside Telescope Makers Conference, Gregory delivered the Robert Fulton Goff Invitational Lecture on Optics and Optical Design, entitled "My 60 Years of Astro-Optics".

Personal life
John Gregory had two sons, Rick and Randy, with his first wife Barbara, lost his second wife Marion to brain cancer, and was married in 1998 to Carolyn. He was an accomplished pianist, jewelry maker, and pilot. He was a frequent attendee at meetings of amateur astronomers, including Stellafane and the Riverside Telescope Makers Conference. He was also active in politics, serving in several political action groups that lobbied for tort reform.

Death
John Gregory died on November 14, 2009, following an automobile accident.  The car his wife Carolyn was driving in Lakeway, Texas, was struck by a pickup truck around 8:20 am.  He and Carolyn were flown to University Medical Center Brackenridge in Austin.  John died later that day from injuries sustained in the accident; Carolyn was critically injured and survived for three months before succumbing to her injuries. The alleged driver of the pickup truck was charged with criminally negligent homicide.

References

1927 births
2009 deaths
Amateur astronomers
People from Cleveland
Optical engineers
People from Dripping Springs, Texas